Kostino is the name of several rural localities in Russia.

Modern localities

Arkhangelsk Oblast
As of 2012, two rural localities in Arkhangelsk Oblast bear this name:
Kostino, Lensky District, Arkhangelsk Oblast, a village in Lensky Selsoviet of Lensky District
Kostino, Plesetsky District, Arkhangelsk Oblast, a village in Krasnovsky Selsoviet of Plesetsky District

Republic of Bashkortostan
As of 2012, one rural locality in the Republic of Bashkortostan bears this name:
Kostino, Republic of Bashkortostan, a village in Pervomaysky Selsoviet of Yanaulsky District

Irkutsk Oblast
As of 2012, one rural locality in Irkutsk Oblast bears this name:
Kostino, Irkutsk Oblast, a settlement in Nizhneudinsky District

Kaliningrad Oblast
As of 2012, one rural locality in Kaliningrad Oblast bears this name:
Kostino, Kaliningrad Oblast, a settlement in Mayakovsky Rural Okrug of Gusevsky District

Kaluga Oblast
As of 2012, four rural localities in Kaluga Oblast bear this name:
Kostino (rural locality), Dzerzhinsky District, Kaluga Oblast, a railway crossing loop in Dzerzhinsky District
Kostino (rural locality), Dzerzhinsky District, Kaluga Oblast, a village in Dzerzhinsky District
Kostino, Maloyaroslavetsky District, Kaluga Oblast, a village in Maloyaroslavetsky District
Kostino, Sukhinichsky District, Kaluga Oblast, a village in Sukhinichsky District

Republic of Khakassia
As of 2012, one rural locality in the Republic of Khakassia bears this name:
Kostino, Republic of Khakassia, a village in Ustinkinsky Selsoviet of Ordzhonikidzevsky District

Kirov Oblast
As of 2012, two rural localities in Kirov Oblast bear this name:
Kostino, Kirov, Kirov Oblast, a settlement under the administrative jurisdiction of Oktyabrsky City District of the City of Kirov
Kostino, Afanasyevsky District, Kirov Oblast, a village in Ichetovkinsky Rural Okrug of Afanasyevsky District;

Kostroma Oblast
As of 2012, five rural localities in Kostroma Oblast bear this name:
Kostino, Pankratovskoye Settlement, Chukhlomsky District, Kostroma Oblast, a village in Pankratovskoye Settlement of Chukhlomsky District
Kostino, Petrovskoye Settlement, Chukhlomsky District, Kostroma Oblast, a village in Petrovskoye Settlement of Chukhlomsky District
Kostino, Galichsky District, Kostroma Oblast, a village in Orekhovskoye Settlement of Galichsky District; 
Kostino, Kadyysky District, Kostroma Oblast, a village in Zavrazhnoye Settlement of Kadyysky District; 
Kostino, Soligalichsky District, Kostroma Oblast, a village in Pervomayskoye Settlement of Soligalichsky District

Krasnoyarsk Krai
As of 2012, one rural locality in Krasnoyarsk Krai bears this name:
Kostino, Krasnoyarsk Krai, a village in Turukhansky District

Leningrad Oblast
As of 2012, one rural locality in Leningrad Oblast bears this name:
Kostino, Leningrad Oblast, a village in Pashskoye Settlement Municipal Formation of Volkhovsky District

Moscow Oblast
As of 2012, eleven rural localities in Moscow Oblast bear this name:
Kostino, Kostinskoye Rural Settlement, Dmitrovsky District, Moscow Oblast, a selo in Kostinskoye Rural Settlement of Dmitrovsky District
Kostino, Sinkovskoye Rural Settlement, Dmitrovsky District, Moscow Oblast, a village in Sinkovskoye Rural Settlement of Dmitrovsky District
Kostino, Yakhroma, Dmitrovsky District, Moscow Oblast, a village under the administrative jurisdiction of the Town of Yakhroma in Dmitrovsky District
Kostino, Orekhovo-Zuyevsky District, Moscow Oblast, a village in Davydovskoye Rural Settlement of Orekhovo-Zuyevsky District
Kostino, Pushkinsky District, Moscow Oblast, a village under the administrative jurisdiction of Pravdinsky Work Settlement in Pushkinsky District
Kostino, Ramensky District, Moscow Oblast, a village in Ulyaninskoye Rural Settlement of Ramensky District
Kostino, Ruzsky District, Moscow Oblast, a village in Staroruzskoye Rural Settlement of Ruzsky District
Kostino, Serpukhovsky District, Moscow Oblast, a village in Dankovskoye Rural Settlement of Serpukhovsky District
Kostino, Shakhovskoy District, Moscow Oblast, a village in Seredinskoye Rural Settlement of Shakhovskoy District
Kostino, Taldomsky District, Moscow Oblast, a village under the administrative jurisdiction of the Town of Taldom in Taldomsky District
Kostino, Yegoryevsky District, Moscow Oblast, a village in Savvinskoye Rural Settlement of Yegoryevsky District

Nizhny Novgorod Oblast
As of 2012, three rural localities in Nizhny Novgorod Oblast bear this name:
Kostino, Bor, Nizhny Novgorod Oblast, a village in Redkinsky Selsoviet under the administrative jurisdiction of the town of oblast significance of Bor
Kostino, Sokolsky District, Nizhny Novgorod Oblast, a village in Mezhdurechensky Selsoviet of Sokolsky District
Kostino, Vadsky District, Nizhny Novgorod Oblast, a village in Kruto-Maydansky Selsoviet of Vadsky District

Novgorod Oblast
As of 2012, one rural locality in Novgorod Oblast bears this name:
Kostino, Novgorod Oblast, a village under the administrative jurisdiction of the settlement of Lyubytinskoye in Lyubytinsky District

Omsk Oblast
As of 2012, one rural locality in Omsk Oblast bears this name:
Kostino, Omsk Oblast, a selo in Kostinsky Rural Okrug of Muromtsevsky District

Orenburg Oblast
As of 2012, one rural locality in Orenburg Oblast bears this name:
Kostino, Orenburg Oblast, a selo in Kostinsky Selsoviet of Kurmanayevsky District

Oryol Oblast
As of 2012, one rural locality in Oryol Oblast bears this name:
Kostino, Oryol Oblast, a village in Podgorodnensky Selsoviet of Maloarkhangelsky District

Pskov Oblast
As of 2012, four rural localities in Pskov Oblast bear this name:
Kostino, Palkinsky District, Pskov Oblast, a village in Palkinsky District
Kostino, Pechorsky District, Pskov Oblast, a village in Pechorsky District
Kostino, Pushkinogorsky District, Pskov Oblast, a village in Pushkinogorsky District
Kostino, Sebezhsky District, Pskov Oblast, a village in Sebezhsky District

Ryazan Oblast
As of 2012, three rural localities in Ryazan Oblast bear this name:
Kostino, Mikhaylovsky District, Ryazan Oblast, a village in Shchegolevsky Rural Okrug of Mikhaylovsky District
Kostino, Rybnovsky District, Ryazan Oblast, a selo in Poshchupovsky Rural Okrug of Rybnovsky District
Kostino, Yermishinsky District, Ryazan Oblast, a village in Bolshelyakhovsky Rural Okrug of Yermishinsky District

Samara Oblast
As of 2012, one rural locality in Samara Oblast bears this name:
Kostino, Samara Oblast, a settlement in Bolshechernigovsky District

Smolensk Oblast
As of 2012, two rural localities in Smolensk Oblast bear this name:
Kostino, Gagarinsky District, Smolensk Oblast, a village in Samuylovskoye Rural Settlement of Gagarinsky District
Kostino, Kholm-Zhirkovsky District, Smolensk Oblast, a village in Nakhimovskoye Rural Settlement of Kholm-Zhirkovsky District

Sverdlovsk Oblast
As of 2012, one rural locality in Sverdlovsk Oblast bears this name:
Kostino, Sverdlovsk Oblast, a selo in Alapayevsky District

Tula Oblast
As of 2012, two rural localities in Tula Oblast bear this name:
Kostino, Leninsky District, Tula Oblast, a village in Varfolomeyevsky Rural Okrug of Leninsky District
Kostino, Zaoksky District, Tula Oblast, a village in Romanovsky Rural Okrug of Zaoksky District

Tver Oblast
As of 2012, eight rural localities in Tver Oblast bear this name:
Kostino, Kimrsky District, Tver Oblast, a village in Pechetovskoye Rural Settlement of Kimrsky District
Kostino, Krasnokholmsky District, Tver Oblast, a village in Likhachevskoye Rural Settlement of Krasnokholmsky District
Kostino, Nelidovsky District, Tver Oblast, a village in Zemtsovskoye Rural Settlement of Nelidovsky District
Kostino, Toropetsky District, Tver Oblast, a village in Skvortsovskoye Rural Settlement of Toropetsky District
Kostino, Torzhoksky District, Tver Oblast, a village in Pirogovskoye Rural Settlement of Torzhoksky District
Kostino, Zharkovsky District, Tver Oblast, a village in Novoselkovskoye Rural Settlement of Zharkovsky District
Kostino, Vazuzskoye Rural Settlement, Zubtsovsky District, Tver Oblast, a village in Vazuzskoye Rural Settlement of Zubtsovsky District
Kostino, Zubtsovskoye Rural Settlement, Zubtsovsky District, Tver Oblast, a village in Zubtsovskoye Rural Settlement of Zubtsovsky District

Udmurt Republic
As of 2012, one rural locality in the Udmurt Republic bears this name:
Kostino, Udmurt Republic, a village in Sigayevsky Selsoviet of Sarapulsky District

Vladimir Oblast
As of 2012, three rural localities in Vladimir Oblast bear this name:
Kostino, Petushinsky District, Vladimir Oblast, a village in Petushinsky District
Kostino, Sobinsky District, Vladimir Oblast, a village in Sobinsky District
Kostino, Sudogodsky District, Vladimir Oblast, a village in Sudogodsky District

Vologda Oblast
As of 2012, ten rural localities in Vologda Oblast bear this name:
Kostino, Novolukinsky Selsoviet, Babayevsky District, Vologda Oblast, a village in Novolukinsky Selsoviet of Babayevsky District
Kostino, Novostarinsky Selsoviet, Babayevsky District, Vologda Oblast, a village in Novostarinsky Selsoviet of Babayevsky District
Kostino, Gulinsky Selsoviet, Belozersky District, Vologda Oblast, a village in Gulinsky Selsoviet of Belozersky District
Kostino, Paninsky Selsoviet, Belozersky District, Vologda Oblast, a village in Paninsky Selsoviet of Belozersky District
Kostino, Cherepovetsky District, Vologda Oblast, a village in Myaksinsky Selsoviet of Cherepovetsky District
Kostino, Gryazovetsky District, Vologda Oblast, a village in Pokrovsky Selsoviet of Gryazovetsky District
Kostino, Kharovsky District, Vologda Oblast, a village in Razinsky Selsoviet of Kharovsky District
Kostino, Vashkinsky District, Vologda Oblast, a village in Porechensky Selsoviet of Vashkinsky District
Kostino, Podlesny Selsoviet, Vologodsky District, Vologda Oblast, a village in Podlesny Selsoviet of Vologodsky District
Kostino, Spassky Selsoviet, Vologodsky District, Vologda Oblast, a village in Spassky Selsoviet of Vologodsky District

Yaroslavl Oblast
As of 2012, five rural localities in Yaroslavl Oblast bear this name:
Kostino, Burmakinsky Rural Okrug, Nekrasovsky District, Yaroslavl Oblast, a village in Burmakinsky Rural Okrug of Nekrasovsky District
Kostino, Klimovsky Rural Okrug, Nekrasovsky District, Yaroslavl Oblast, a village in Klimovsky Rural Okrug of Nekrasovsky District
Kostino, Ogarkovsky Rural Okrug, Rybinsky District, Yaroslavl Oblast, a village in Ogarkovsky Rural Okrug of Rybinsky District
Kostino, Pokrovsky Rural Okrug, Rybinsky District, Yaroslavl Oblast, a settlement in Pokrovsky Rural Okrug of Rybinsky District
Kostino, Yaroslavsky District, Yaroslavl Oblast, a village in Ivnyakovsky Rural Okrug of Yaroslavsky District

Abolished localities
Kostino, Sharya, Kostroma Oblast, a village under the administrative jurisdiction of the town of oblast significance of Sharya; abolished on October 6, 2004

References

Notes

Sources